Stephen Huss and Ross Hutchins were the defending champions, but they chose to participate at the Rakuten Japan Open Tennis Championships instead.

Bob Bryan and Mike Bryan won in the final 6–4, 6–2 against Mark Knowles and Andy Roddick.

Seeds

Draw

External links
 Main Draw

China Open - Men's Doubles
2009 China Open (tennis)